Arne Watle was a Norwegian businessperson. He was hired as CEO of the bus company Trondheim Bilruter in 1951, and also became CEO of Trondheim Trafikkselskap after the merger. He was replaced by Jan Reinås in 1983.

References

Year of birth missing
Year of death missing
Norwegian businesspeople
Trondheim Tramway people